Khorta is a rural locality (a selo) in Khidibsky Selsoviet, Tlyaratinsky District, Republic of Dagestan, Russia. The population was 65 as of 2010.

Geography 
Khorta is located 25 km north of Tlyarata (the district's administrative centre) by road. Maalib is the nearest rural locality.

References 

Rural localities in Tlyaratinsky District